George Woodard (born June 18, 1952) is an actor, musician, and dairy farmer in Waterbury Center, Vermont. He experimented with acting in high school, taking part in high school and local summer stock plays and musicals, while rebuilding the family dairy business.  Later he moved to Hollywood for approximately four years to explore acting.  During this time, he worked on low budget and student films, learning the mechanics of film production along with screenplay writing, and directing.  He also delivered JAN-AL ATA grade flight cases to various rock and roll royalty...to pay the bills.  The need for someone to lead the operation of the Woodard family farm brought him home to Vermont. He took over the dairy business and has been doing it ever since. His job of dairy farming mixed with his acting career resulted in his being featured in an article for Premiere Magazine.

In between milking twice a day, he found the time to be in films Time Chasers, Ethan Frome, My Mother's Early Lovers, The Mudge Boy, Mud Season, America's Heart and Soul, along with a few TV commercials.  He also created his own home-grown variety show, The Ground Hog Opry, which combines Vermont-related political satire with songs written by Woodard and other members of the cast, including writing partner Charles "Al" Boright.

In 2010, Woodard wrote the screenplay, directed, edited and acted, along with a solid local cast for The Summer of Walter Hacks, a coming of age story, set in the long forgotten rural New England of the 1950s. The film was shot in color, then transferred to black and white, a medium Woodard says, "you can do things in black and white that just don't work in color...like darker shadows, high contrast starkness, and more."  The Film has been successful on the independent film circuit and has been enjoyed by thousands. Due to a unique arrangement with some of the copyrighted content, originally the film could not legally be duplicated and was shown only to live audiences on a regional barnstorming effort by Woodard and producer Gerianne Smart.

Plans for duplication are still being considered.

His major role in the 1994 film Time Chasers, has been successfully lampooned by the popular Mystery Science Theater 3000. A running gag in the episode is Mike and the Bots comically mimicking Woodard's voice.

He is also featured in two short children's films, "Where the Garbage Goes" (1997) and "Road Construction Ahead" (1991), which are part of the children's series Little Hardhats.

References

External links
 

American male film actors
Living people
People from Waterbury, Vermont
Male actors from Vermont
1952 births